Greensburg station is an Amtrak railway station located approximately  east of Pittsburgh at Harrison Avenue and Seton Hill Drive in Greensburg, Pennsylvania. The station is located just north of the city center. It is served only by Amtrak's Pennsylvanian, which operates once daily in each direction.

History 
The station was opened in 1912 by the Pennsylvania Railroad as part of a project to elevate the right-of-way as it passed through Greensburg. William Holmes Cookman served as architect. The depot is constructed of red brick laid in a Flemish bond pattern with stone trim and quoins on the building's corners; the overall architectural style is Jacobean Revival. A copper ogee dome with a finial tops a tall square clock tower. Ornamented parapets with center cartouches and corner finials surround the dome.

From March to November 1981, the station was the eastern terminus of PennDOT's Parkway Limited train, which took commuters to Pittsburgh. Until 2005, Greensburg was served by the Three Rivers (a replacement service for the Broadway Limited), an extended version of the Pennsylvanian that terminated in Chicago. Its cancellation marked the first time in Greensburg's railway history that a single daily passenger train served the town. The small shelter that serves as the present station has no ticket office.

The station has been listed on the National Register of Historic Places since 1977. The historic station now houses a restaurant.

All WCTA bus routes pass through Greensburg Station at the transit center. Greyhound also has a bus stop at the WCTA transit center.

Gallery

References

External links

Greensburg Amtrak Station (USA Rail Guide - TrainWeb)

Railway stations in the United States opened in 1912
Amtrak stations in Pennsylvania
Railway stations on the National Register of Historic Places in Pennsylvania
Historic American Engineering Record in Pennsylvania
Stations on the Pittsburgh Line
Greensburg, Pennsylvania
1912 establishments in Pennsylvania
National Register of Historic Places in Westmoreland County, Pennsylvania
Former Pennsylvania Railroad stations